My Father Is a Chieftain is a 2022 Russian children's comedy film directed by Egor Konchalovsky. It stars Dmitry Nagiyev. It was theatrically released on May 26, 2022.

Plot 
The film tells about a sea captain who, ten years after his disappearance, returned home in the form of an African leader and now he walks around the city with a spear, not recognizing the rules of modern society.

Cast

References

External links 
 

2022 films
2020s Russian-language films
2020s children's comedy films
Russian children's adventure films
Russian children's comedy films
Russian adventure comedy films